The Federal Correctional Institution, Ray Brook (FCI Ray Brook) is a medium-security United States federal prison for male inmates that is operated by the Federal Bureau of Prisons, a division of the United States Department of Justice.

FCI Ray Brook is located in Essex County, New York, midway between the villages of Lake Placid and Saranac Lake. Although constructed as a prison, it initially served as the Olympic Village for the 1980 Winter Olympics, which were held in Lake Placid.

History
Lake Placid was considered an ideal site for the available infrastructure from the 1932 Winter Olympics, most notably the Bobsleigh run. The existing facilities meant the Olympics could be staged on a reasonable budget and with limited environmental impact. It was not just a matter of convenience, either, according to Lake Placid’s congressman, Representative Robert McEwen. “It is no secret to us in America that the measure of federal support given to athletes in Communist countries (so that they win medals and improve the countries' image abroad) is on a level unknown to us here in America,” he told Congress.” This would be a step in the right direction, a worthy investment in American winter athletes.” The local Olympic committee needed congressional approval for funding to build the Olympic Village. Congress required an after use contract for facilities, and it was agreed that the Olympic Village would be built in accordance to Federal Bureau of Prisons needs. Following the Olympic Games, it was repurposed for Federal Correctional Institution, Ray Brook. 

The prison became operational following the conclusion of the Olympics and accepted its first inmates that same year. Local activists and international participants had protested the dual purpose building. Decarceration activists formed the coalition Stop the Olympic Prison (STOP) arguing that the location and scale of the project contradicted federal recommendations for new prisons.

In 2010, FCI Ray Brook commemorated its thirtieth anniversary. In 2016, the institution became host to a pilot Pell Grant program offering college coursework through North Country Community College.

The Bureau of Prisons has received numerous complaints regarding conditions at FCI Ray Brook. The United States Court of Appeals for the Second Circuit reinstated a previously dismissed lawsuit filed against the Bureau of Prisons on behalf of six inmates who were allegedly housed in an extremely hot and cramped single room without adequate ventilation and cleaning supplies. The Court found that the evidence justified a claim of cruel and unusual punishment. The lawsuit is currently pending.

Notable inmates (current and former)
†Temporarily transferred to the Metropolitan Detention Center, Brooklyn pending an appeal.

See also 

 List of U.S. federal prisons
 Federal Bureau of Prisons
 Incarceration in the United States

References

External links 
 

Buildings of the United States government in New York (state)
Buildings and structures in Essex County, New York
Ray Brook
Prisons in New York (state)
1980 establishments in New York (state)